Hillsborough County is the most populous county in the U.S. state of New Hampshire. As of the 2020 census, the population was 422,937, almost one-third the population of the entire state. Its county seats are Manchester and Nashua, the state's two biggest cities. Hillsborough is northern New England's most populous county as well as its most densely populated.

Hillsborough County comprises the Manchester-Nashua, NH Metropolitan Statistical Area, which in turn constitutes a portion of the Boston-Worcester-Providence, MA-RI-NH-CT Combined Statistical Area.

History
Hillsborough was one of the five original counties identified for New Hampshire in 1769, and was named for Wills Hill, 1st Earl of Hillsborough, who was British Secretary of State for the Colonies at the time. The county was formally organized at Amherst on March 19, 1771.

In 1823, twelve townships of Hillsborough Country – Andover, Boscawen, Bradford, Dunbarton, Fishersfield (now Newbury), Henniker, Hooksett, Hopkinton, New London, Salisbury, Sutton, and Warner – became part of Merrimack County. The town of Merrimack along the Merrimack River in south-central Hillsborough County was not included in the newly formed county  to the north. Hillsborough County's administrative functions were moved from Amherst to Milford in 1866, and then to the current seats of Manchester and Nashua in 1869.

Geography

Adjacent counties
 Merrimack County (north)
 Rockingham County (east)
 Essex County, Massachusetts (southeast)
 Middlesex County, Massachusetts (south)
 Worcester County, Massachusetts (southwest)
 Cheshire County (west)
 Sullivan County (northwest)

National protected area
 Wapack National Wildlife Refuge

Politics and government

In the 2012 presidential election, Time had listed Hillsborough as one of five critical counties affecting the outcome in the swing state of New Hampshire. Obama ended up winning with a margin of 50%–49%. Despite its more urban nature, Hillsborough County has historically been a more Republican leaning part of the state, although there is evidence to suggest that is changing. In 2020, Joe Biden and Jeanne Shaheen won Hillsborough County by a wider margin than they won statewide by. Biden also received the highest percentage of the vote for a Democrat since Lyndon Johnson's 1964 landslide, largely driven due to large swings to Democrats in the county's historically Republican suburban communities.

|}

County Commission
The executive power of Hillsborough County's government is held by three county commissioners, each representing one of the three commissioner districts within the county.

In addition to the county commission, there are five directly elected officials; they include county attorney, register of deeds, county sheriff, register of probate, and county treasurer.

Legislative branch
The legislative branch of Hillsborough County is made up of all of the members of the New Hampshire House of Representatives from the county. As of 2022, there are 123 members from 45 districts.

Demographics

As of the 2020 United States census, there were 422,937 people residing in the county.

The racial makeup of the county was 81.0% white, 4.8% Asian, 3.9% black or African American, 1.7% American Indian, 2.1% from other races, and 2.0% from two or more races. Those of Hispanic or Latino origin made up 8% of the population.

For the period 2011–2015, 24.8% of the county's population had French ancestry (including 9.9% of the total population with French Canadian ancestry), 20.9% had Irish, 13.1% had English, 10.2% had Italian, and 8.2% had German ancestry. For the same time period, the estimated median annual income for a household in the county was $71,244, and the median income for a family was $85,966. Male full-time workers had a median income of $60,349 versus $44,270 for females. The per capita income for the county was $35,242. About 5.8% of families and 8.8% of the population were below the poverty line, including 11.7% of those under age 18 and 5.9% of those age 65 or over.

Communities

Cities
 Manchester (county seat)
 Nashua (county seat)

Towns

 Amherst
 Antrim
 Bedford
 Bennington
 Brookline
 Deering
 Francestown
 Goffstown
 Greenfield
 Greenville
 Hancock
 Hillsborough
 Hollis
 Hudson
 Litchfield
 Lyndeborough
 Mason
 Merrimack
 Milford
 Mont Vernon
 New Boston
 New Ipswich
 Pelham
 Peterborough
 Sharon
 Temple
 Weare
 Wilton
 Windsor

Census-designated places

 Amherst
 Antrim
 Bennington
 East Merrimack
 Francestown
 Goffstown
 Greenville
 Hancock
 Hillsborough
 Hudson
 Klondike Corner
 Milford
 New Boston
 Peterborough
 Pinardville
 Wilton

Villages
 Grasmere
 West Peterborough

Former towns
 Monson

Education
School districts include:

K-12 districts:

 Bedford School District
 Contoocook Valley School District
 Goffstown School District
 Hillsboro-Deering Cooperative School District
 Hudson School District
 Litchfield School District
 Manchester School District
 Mascenic Regional School District
 Merrimack School District
 Milford School District
 Nashua School District
 Pelham School District
 Wilton-Lyndeborough School District
 Windsor School District

Secondary districts:

 Hollis-Brookline Cooperative School District
 Souhegan Cooperative School District
 John Stark Regional School District

Elementary districts:

 Amherst School District
 Brookline School District
 Hollis School District
 Mason School District
 Mont Vernon School District
 New Boston School District
 Weare School District

Previously Bedford sent high school students to the Manchester School District.

See also

 National Register of Historic Places listings in Hillsborough County, New Hampshire

References

External links

 Hillsborough County web site
 National Register of Historic Places listing for Hillsborough County
 Hillsborough County Sheriff Office
 Historical material in Statistics and Gazetteer of New Hampshire (1875)

 
Counties in Greater Boston
1769 establishments in New Hampshire
Populated places established in 1769